Por los Siglos (English: For the Centuries) is a compilation album by Mexican singer Juan Gabriel released on October 9, 2001. This compilation album consists of ten of the most acclaimed hits re-recorded who celebrates his 30th career anniversary of music with new versions.

Track listing

Sales and certifications

References

External links 
official website
 Por Los Siglos on amazon.com
 Por Los Siglos on cduniverse.com

Juan Gabriel compilation albums
2000 greatest hits albums